Confession is a 2015 South Korean film starring Kim Young-ho, Yoon In-jo and Choi Cheol-ho. The mystery film, directed by Jung Young-bae, is about a man who tries to uncover the truth about his past.

Plot
Sang-woo (Kim Young-ho) lost his memory after an accident. He becomes suspicious about his past, and when he finds out his wife's affair, he becomes obsessed to uncover the truth.

Cast
 Kim Young-ho as Sang-woo
 Yoon In-jo as Yoon-hee 
 Choi Cheol-ho as Min-sik 
 Choo So-young as Mi-hyun

References

External links 
 
 
 

2015 films
2010s Korean-language films
South Korean mystery films
Films directed by Jung Young-bae
2010s South Korean films